Black Fire is a 1995 combat flight simulation video game developed by NovaLogic, published in North America by Sega and in Japan and Europe by Virgin Interactive for the Sega Saturn.

Gameplay 

Black Fire is a helicopter combat flight simulation game.

Development and release

Reception 
Next Generation reviewed the Saturn version of the game, rating it three stars out of five, and stated that "The obvious attempt to be all things to all gamers makes it too easy to overlook the impressive elements of Blackfire, such as the occasionally stunning graphics and intense action sequences, but with time these rewarding facets do manage to make their way to the surface. Perhaps if there was more of a strategic approach to the action as opposed to the shoot-'em-up angle, then these elements would be more obvious. As is, Blackfire has its moments, but it lacks a consistent hook."

Reviews
GameFan #32 (Vol 3, Issue 8) 1995 August
GameFan #35 (Vol 3, Issue 11)  1995 November
GamePro (Mar, 1996)
Mean Machines - Aug, 1996
GameFan Magazine - Oct, 1995
Game Revolution - Jun 06, 2004

Notes

References

External links 

 Black Fire at GameFAQs
 Black Fire at MobyGames

1995 video games
Combat flight simulators
Helicopter video games
NovaLogic games
Sega Saturn games
Sega Saturn-only games
Video games developed in the United States